The 2014 CERH European Championship was the 51st edition of the CERH European Roller Hockey Championship, a tournament for men's national roller hockey teams organized by CERH which took place in Alcobendas, Spain. Italy won the tournament and took its third title overall.

It began on 14 July and concluded on 19 July, with a single group stage played to determine the winner. It was the eighth time that Spain has hosted the competition, the first being in 1951 (in the city of Barcelona).

The national teams of five countries qualified automatically to participate with the host nation Spain in the final tournament. A total of 15 matches were played in the Pabellón Amaya Valdemoro, situated in Alcobendas.

With the host country, two European champion teams since the first European Championship in 1926 — Italy and Portugal — have entered this competition. The title holders, Spain, finished the tournament in second place. Previous winner Portugal took the third place.

Standings

Squads

Matches
The matches were played from 14 July 2014 to 19 July 2014.

Matchday 1

Matchday 2

Matchday 3

Matchday 4

Matchday 5

See also
 CERH European Roller Hockey Championship

External links

 2013/14 international competitions calendar (accordingly to CERH)

References

International roller hockey competitions hosted by Spain
2014 in Spanish sport
CERH European Roller Hockey Championship
2014 in roller hockey